In Greek mythology, Themiste or Themis was a Trojan princess and daughter of King Ilus II of Troad and possibly, Eurydice or Leucippe. She was the (half) sister of Laomedon, Tithonius and Telecleia. Themiste was married off by Ilus to her cousin King Capys, son of Assaracus and Hieromneme, and became the queen of Dardania. With him she became the mother of Anchises and possibly, Acoetes. The former son would later become the father of the famous Aeneas while the later one, became the father of the priest Laocoon.

Family tree

Notes

References 

 Apollodorus, The Library with an English Translation by Sir James George Frazer, F.B.A., F.R.S. in 2 Volumes, Cambridge, MA, Harvard University Press; London, William Heinemann Ltd. 1921. ISBN 0-674-99135-4. Online version at the Perseus Digital Library. Greek text available from the same website.
 Gaius Julius Hyginus, Fabulae from The Myths of Hyginus translated and edited by Mary Grant. University of Kansas Publications in Humanistic Studies. Online version at the Topos Text Project.
Princesses in Greek mythology

Queens in Greek mythology
Trojans